Muhammad Rifqi (born 6 February 1993, in Medan) is an Indonesian professional footballer who plays as a defender for Liga 1 club Persita Tangerang.

Club career

Persegres Gresik United
In the 2015 season, Rifqi joined Persegres Gresik United for Indonesia Super League. He made his debut on 5 April 2015 in a match against Borneo. In ISC A, he made his first goal for Gresik United when he scored against Persija Jakarta in the 1st minute.

Barito Putera
In 2017, Rifqi joined Liga 1 club Barito Putera. He made his debut on 4 July 2017 in a match against Bhayangkara. On 6 August 2017, Rifqi scored his first goal for Barito Putera in the 56th minute against Persija Jakarta.

Semen padang
In 2019, Muhammad Rifqi signed a one-year contract with Indonesian Liga club Semen Padang. He made his debut on 20 May 2019 in a match against PSM Makassar. On 21 June 2019, Rifqi scored his first goal for Semen Padang in the 33rd minute against Badak Lampung.

PSMS Medan
He was signed for PSMS Medan to play in Liga 2 in the 2020 season. This season was suspended on 27 March 2020 due to the COVID-19 pandemic. The season was abandoned and was declared void on 20 January 2021.

Mitra Kukar
In 2021, Rifqi signed a contract with Indonesian Liga 2 club Mitra Kukar. He made his league debut on 11 October 2021 against Sulut United at the Tuah Pahoe Stadium, Palangka Raya.

Persikabo 1973
He was signed for Persikabo 1973 to play in Liga 1 in the 2021 season. He made his league debut on 3 February 2022 in a match against Bali United at the Ngurah Rai Stadium, Denpasar.

Persita Tengerang
Rifqi was signed for Persita Tangerang to play in Liga 1 in the 2022–23 season. He made his league debut on 25 July 2022 in a match against Persik Kediri at the Indomilk Arena, Tangerang.

References

External links
 

1993 births
Living people
Indonesian footballers
People from Medan
Sportspeople from North  Sumatra
Sportspeople from Medan
Association football defenders
Indonesian Premier League players
Liga 2 (Indonesia) players
Liga 1 (Indonesia) players
Sriwijaya F.C. players
Pro Duta FC players
PS Barito Putera players
Persegres Gresik players
Gresik United players
Semen Padang F.C. players
PSMS Medan players
Mitra Kukar players
Persikabo 1973 players
Persita Tangerang players
21st-century Indonesian people